Nikyup Point (‘Nos Nikyup’ \'nos ni-'kyup\) is the point on the east side of the entrance to Ognen Cove on Trinity Peninsula, Antarctic Peninsula.  Situated 12.65 km south-southeast of Radibosh Point, 6.3 km northeast of Velichkov Knoll, 6.76 km west of Almond Point and 19.2 km southwest of Cape Kjellman.  Shape enhanced as a result of Andrew Glacier’s retreat and associated forming of Ognen Cove in the late 20th and early 21st century.

The point is named after the settlement of Nikyup in northern Bulgaria.

Location
German-British mapping in 1996.

Maps
 Trinity Peninsula. Scale 1:250000 topographic map No. 5697. Institut für Angewandte Geodäsie and British Antarctic Survey, 1996.
 Antarctic Digital Database (ADD). Scale 1:250000 topographic map of Antarctica. Scientific Committee on Antarctic Research (SCAR). Since 1993, regularly updated.

References
 Bulgarian Antarctic Gazetteer. Antarctic Place-names Commission. (details in Bulgarian, basic data in English)
 Nikyup Point. SCAR Composite Antarctic Gazetteer

External links
 Nikyup Point. Copernix satellite image

Headlands of Trinity Peninsula
Bulgaria and the Antarctic